Semecarpus reticulatus (aka S. reticulata) is a tree species in the family Anacardiaceae.  It can be found in China (Yunnan), Laos, northern Thailand and Viet Nam (where it may be called sựng mạng); no subspecies are listed in the Catalogue of Life.

References 

reticulatus
Flora of Indo-China